Trichasterina is a genus of fungi in the Asterinaceae family. The relationship of this taxon to other taxa within the class is unknown (incertae sedis), and it has not yet been placed with certainty into any order.

Species
As accepted by Species Fungorum;
 Trichasterina calophylli 
 Trichasterina cheirodendri 
 Trichasterina desmotis 
 Trichasterina goniothalami 
 Trichasterina goniothalamicola 
 Trichasterina heritierae 
 Trichasterina microspila 
 Trichasterina myrtaceicola 
 Trichasterina polyalthiae 
 Trichasterina popowiae 
 Trichasterina styracis

References

External links
Index Fungorum

Asterinaceae